Menara is the Arabic term for lighthouse tower, other words are derived from this term including the Islamic Minaret. 

The term Menara can also refer to:

Places

Indonesia
 Jakarta Tower, a tower located in Jakarta, Indonesia

Israel
 Menara, Israel, a kibbutz in Israel

Malaysia
 Menara Warisan Merdeka, a megatall skyscraper in Kuala Lumpur
 Menara Petronas, a twin skyscrapers in Kuala Lumpur
 Menara TRX, a office skyscraper in Kuala Lumpur
 Menara KL, a tower building in Kuala Lumpur
 Menara Telekom, the headquarters of Telekom Malaysia in Kuala Lumpur
 Menara Mesiniaga, a futuristic building in Malaysia
 Menara Alor Star, a telecommunication tower located in Kedah
 Menara Taming Sari, a gyro tower in Malacca City

Morocco
 Menara, Maroc Telecom, a Moroccan internet access provider; a subsidiary of Maroc Telecom
 Menara gardens, gardens located at Marrakech
 Menara International Airport, the international airport of Marrakech

Spain 
 Almenara is a municipality located in the province of Castellón, Valencian Community, Spain.

Tunisia 
 Bab Menara (Arabic: باب منارة) is one of the gates of the medina of Tunis.

Plant 
 Menara (tree), the name of a Shorea faguetiana, the tallest documented angiosperm.